Hog Wild is an album by the American musician Hank Williams Jr. It was released in 1995 on Curb Records. Williams supported the album with a North American tour.

Production
The album was produced by Chuck Howard and Williams. Williams wrote or cowrote six of the 10 songs.

Critical reception

Entertainment Weekly called the album "lame," noting that "Junior salutes the girls of Daytona Beach and makes pig calls on the title song." The Calgary Herald dismissed it as "two-bit rock 'n' roll." 

The Ottawa Citizen wrote that "Williams's two biker tunes, 'Hog Wild' and 'Iron Horse', both have a spirited kind of energy." The Indianapolis Star concluded that "'Daytona Nights' and 'It's a Start' are sure to appeal to women who don't mind being bedded, then stalked."

Track listing
 "Hog Wild – 3:31 (Hank Williams Jr., Rick Arnold)
 "I Ain't Goin' Peacefully" – 3:02 (Williams Jr.)
 "Between Heaven and Hell" – 3:22 (Tommy Barnes)
 "Iron Horse" – 3:43 (Williams Jr.)
 "Daytona Nights" – 4:19 (Williams Jr.)
 "Tobacco Road" – 4:11 (John D. Loudermilk)
 "It's a Start" – 2:59 (Danny Bear Mayo, Bob Regan) 
 "Greeted in Enid" – 2:46 (Williams Jr.)
 "Eyes of Waylon" – 6:16 (Williams Jr.)
 "Wild Thing" – 7:35 (Chip Taylor)

Personnel
 Rick Arnold – jew's harp
 Kenny Aronoff – drums
 Butch Baker – background vocals
 Greg Barnhill – background vocals
 Bruce Bouton – steel guitar
 Larry Franklin – fiddle
 Paul Franklin – steel guitar
 Ricky Lynn Gregg – electric guitar
 Tony Harrell – keyboards, organ, piano
 Mike Haynes – trumpet
 John Hobbs – keyboards, organ, piano
 Jim Horn – baritone saxophone
 Carl Jackson – background vocals
 John Jorgenson – electric guitar
 Mary Ann Kennedy – background vocals
 Jana King – background vocals
 Terry McMillan – harmonica, percussion
 Steve Nathan – keyboards, organ, piano
 Danny Parks – fiddle
 Charles Rose – trombone
 Billy Bob Shane – background vocals
 Hank Singer – fiddle
 Denis Solee – clarinet, tenor saxophone
 Michael Spriggs – acoustic guitar
 Hank Williams Jr. – acoustic guitar, lead vocals
 John Willis – electric guitar
 Glenn Worf – bass guitar
 Curtis Young – background vocals

Chart performance

References

External links
 Hank Williams Jr's Official Website
 Record Label

1995 albums
Hank Williams Jr. albums
Curb Records albums